The Leonardo da Vinci Art School (the "Leonardo") was an art school founded in New York City (1923–1942), whose most famous student was Isamu Noguchi and whose director was sculptor and poet Onorio Ruotolo.

History

First decade

With sculptor Attilio Piccirilli, Ruotolo founded the school to provide low-cost, often free art instruction to the working poor, mostly in the evening.  The school was first located at St. Nicholas of Myra, Christian Orthodox Church, 288 East 10th Street, off Avenue A and near Tompkins Square Park. Tuition was six dollars ($6) per month—or free.  Students in the 1920s included Noguchi and Esther Shemitz.

To foster Noguchi's decision to study sculpture, Ruotolo offered him a job that paid as much as other work he had.  Later, Noguchi recalled, "How could I resist?  I became a sculptor, even against my will."  After only three months at the "Leonardoo" (as the school was known), Noguchi held a solo exhibition.  Ruotolo also helped Noguchi get commissions for outside sculpture work.

Second decade

In 1934, the school reorganized and reopened at 149 East 34th Street, graced by "The New Deal" mural of Conrad Albrizio.  With political and union backing, the school expanded to include the "Friends of Italian Arts Association," eliminating tuition altogether, so that student needed provide only their own art materials.  No employees received payment for their services.  For the school's rededication, Mayor Fiorello LaGuardia unveiled a fresco symbolic of the New Deal.

Closure

Contributions diminished significantly during World War II, leading to the Leonardo's closture at its third and final location at 130 East 16th Street on April 28, 1942.

Legacy

In addition to starting the career of Noguchi, the Leonardo also was the only school in its time to teach the art of fresco painting.

People associated

Instructors
 Attilio Piccirilli
 Onorio Ruotolo
 John Sennhauser

Alumni
 Peter Agostini
 Nicolas Carone
 Angelo Ippolito
 Elaine de Kooning
 Isamu Noguchi
 Esther Shemitz

Associated art
 "The New Deal" by Conrad A. Albrizio (1934), placed in the Auditoriom of the Leonardo da Vinci Art School at 149 East 34th Street, NYC
 "Cantus" by Onorio Ruotolo (1933)
 Depression Art Gallery

References

External links
 Joseph Sciorra and Peter Vellon, "Onorio Ruotolo: A Life in Art and Politics," America and Italia Review (April 2004)
 John D. Calandra Italian American Institute - The Art of Freedom: Onorio Ruotolo and the Leonardo da Vinci Art School (February 23, 2004 – April 5, 2004)
 SIRIS Onorio Ruotolo papers (1917-1958) in Smithsonian Institution Research Information System
Immigration History Research Center Archives - Onorio Ruotolo papers (1888-1966)
 Noguchi Museum - Onorio Ruotolo
 Vintage and Modern, Inc. Onorio Ruotolo
 Encyclopædia Britannica - Isamu Noguchi
 Stanford University - Obituary for Lucio Ruotolo (1927-2003), son of Onorio Ruotolo
 OvationTV - Isamu Noguchi
 Morson Collection - Isamu Noguchi

Culture of New York City
Art schools in New York City
Arts organizations established in 1923
Education in New York (state)
Educational institutions established in 1923
1923 establishments in New York City
Educational institutions disestablished in 1942
1942 disestablishments in New York (state)